Montauban-sur-l'Ouvèze (literally Montauban on the Ouvèze; Vivaro-Alpine: Montauban d'Ovèsa) is a commune in the Drôme department in southeastern France.

Population

See also
Communes of the Drôme department

References

Communes of Drôme
Monte Carlo Rally